In enzymology, a biuret amidohydrolase is an enzyme that catalyzes the chemical reaction

biuret + H2O  urea(CH4N2O) + CO2 + NH3

Thus, the two substrates of this enzyme are biuret and H2O, whereas its 3 products are urea, CO2, and NH3.

This enzyme belongs to the family of hydrolases, those acting on carbon-nitrogen bonds other than peptide bonds, specifically in linear amides.  The systematic name of this enzyme class is biuret amidohydrolase. This enzyme participates in atrazine degradation.

References

 

EC 3.5.1
Enzymes of unknown structure